KXCB (1420 kHz) is an AM radio station broadcasting a country music format. Licensed to serve Omaha, Nebraska, United States, the station serves the Omaha area, with an emphasis on nearby Council Bluffs, Iowa. KXCB's license is owned by Hickory Radio, LLC, located in Omaha, Nebraska.

KXCB's studios are located on Burt Street (near North 120th Street and Dodge Road) in West Omaha, while its two-tower transmitter array is located in south Council Bluffs, Iowa, across the Missouri River from South Omaha.

History
The station went on the air on March 2, 1957, under the name KOOO, sporting a country music format, later simulcasting with 104.5 FM, which went on the air on May 12, 1972.

By 1978, KOOO had changed to a news/talk format, with 104.5 FM moving to MOR.

In March 1979, it flipped to an easy listening format and was renamed KESY, again simulcasting with 104.5. In 1980, the AM reverted to the old KOOO call sign and adopted a Music of Your Life/nostalgia format.

In 1984, the call sign changed to KROM. In 1986, the AM once again became KESY with a beautiful music format, although not simulcasting 104.5.

For a brief two-week period in June 1990, the calls became KLAO before reverting to KESY, though the AM would adopt an adult contemporary format as well.

In January 1995, the station changed its call sign to KBBX, and flipped to an urban oldies format.

Journal Communications purchased KBBX in January 1998 and changed the programming to a Regional Mexican format on April 1 of that year. On May 10, 2002, as part of a major format shuffle, the format would move to then-sister station 97.7 FM. After two weeks of simulcasting, the station became KHLP with an advice talk format.

In April 2005, it was announced that Journal had sold KHLP to Salem Communications, and in December of that year, the station flipped to conservative talk as "Newstalk 1420 KOTK". On September 4, 2008, KOTK flipped to a Spanish religion format with the slogan "La Luz".

On April 4, 2016, KOTK changed its format to conservative talk, branded as "94.5/1420 The Answer".

In July 2018, Hickory Radio purchased the station from Salem Media Group.

On March 31, 2019, KOTK flipped to a simulcast of oldies-formatted KOBM (1490 AM), branded as "Boomer Radio". The following day, KOTK changed call letters to KOBM, with 1490 AM adopting the KIBM call letters.

On December 20, 2022, the station changed its call sign to KXCB. On February 1, 2023, KXCB dropped the KIBM simulcast and became a country music station aimed at Council Bluffs, Iowa, branded as "Bluffs Country 106.5".

References

External links

FCC History Cards for KOBM

XCB
Radio stations established in 1957
1957 establishments in Nebraska
Country radio stations in the United States